José Antonio Santamaría Vaqueriza (16 March 1946 – 19 January 1993) was a Spanish footballer. After retiring from football he had a career as an entrepreneur in the hospitality sector. He was murdered in a terrorist attack at the age of 46.

Playing career
During his career as a professional, he played for SD Eibar (1963 to 1964), San Sebastián – reserve team of Real Sociedad – (1964 to 1967), the aforementioned club's first team (1967 to 1971), Hércules CF (1971 to 1974) and finished his career at CE Sabadell FC (1974 to 1975).

International
Santamaría played for his country at the under-23 level and was shortlisted to play for the senior team on several occasions.

After football
After retiring from football, Santamaría with other partners opened a nightclub in San Sebastián called the Ku Nightclub. This club was a great success and would become one of the hottest spots in town. In 1978, along with two other partners, he expanded the  Ku franchise to the island of Ibiza, acquiring and expanding existing premises that would become known as Ku club Ibiza (Now Privilege Ibiza). During the 1980s, the open-air Ku Club Ibiza became one of the most famous and fashionable 'super clubs'in the world, even being included in the Guinness Book of Records. Santamaría had among his personal friends personalities such as the film director Roman Polanski, who at that time had a house in Ibiza.

He was killed in an attack committed by ETA in 1993.

References

1946 births
1993 deaths
Spanish footballers
Footballers from San Sebastián
Association football defenders
SD Eibar footballers
Real Sociedad footballers
Real Sociedad B footballers
Hércules CF players
CE Sabadell FC footballers
La Liga players
Segunda División players
Tercera División players
People killed by ETA (separatist group)
Assassinated businesspeople
20th-century Spanish businesspeople
People murdered in Spain
Deaths by firearm in Spain
Nightclub owners